Nain Singh Thapa or Nayan Singh Thapa (died late 1806 or early 1807) was a Nepalese Kaji (minister) and a military general. He died in the offensive campaign of Kangra from bullet injury. He was the owner of the Thapathali Durbar temple complex.

Career
He was a Kaji and General of Nepal Army. A royal order was decreed on Ashwin Sudi 2, 1862 V.S. (September 1805), for the preparations of Kangra campaign. In September 1805, while being deputed at Kangra Fort, his brother Mukhtiyar Bhimsen Thapa ordered him to arrest military deserters. Gorkhali forces under Badakaji Amar Singh Thapa, Rudrabir [Shah] and Nain Singh overran Nalagarh and crossed Sutlej river. They fought battle against King Sansar Chand at Mahal Mori in May 1806 and defeated him there. Sansar Chand fled to Kangra fort after taking refuge at Sujanpur Tira. Widow of Kirti Chand, Commander of Kangra Army and Nain Singh, the Nepalese commander led the battle at Tira Sujanpur. The Gorkhali invasion became persistent and irresistible. On Saturday V.S. 1863 Kartik Badi 13 (i.e. 8 November 1806), there was a letter which positioned Bhakti Thapa under the joint authority of Badakaji Amar Singh Thapa and Nain Singh. Kaji Nain Singh came with a reinforcement of 1500 men along with Sardar Udatta Shahi leading 3 companies while Subba Ranganath Gurung and Prahlad Gurung had led 4 companies. Nain Singh and Amar Singh were entrusted with the main Nain Singh fought at Kangra fort and was mortally wounded from which he died in the winter of 1806/1807. The Bhasavamshawali also states the death of Nain Singh on 1728 Saka Era i.e. (1806/7) A.D. The event was sketched by 19th-century Garhwali poet and painter Mola Ram. In the 1852 interview, Jang Bahadur Rana mentioned the death of his maternal grandfather Nain Singh at Kangra.

Family Tree

He was born as second son to Sanukaji Amar Singh Thapa. Nayan Singh Thapa had 4 brothers – Bhimsen Thapa, Bhaktawar Singh, Amrit Singh and Ranbir Singh and two step-brothers – Ranzawar and Ranbam. He was father of Mathabarsingh Thapa, Queen Tripurasundari of Nepal and grandfather of Jung Bahadur Rana. He was the son-in-law of Chief Kazi Ranajit Pande of noble Pande family and father-in-law of Kazi Bal Narsingh Kunwar of the noble Kunwar Rana family. Kumar Pradhan asserts that Sher Jung Thapa was son of Nain Singh Thapa, whom Bhimsen adopted while Baburam Acharya contradicts that Sher Jung Thapa was nephew of Mathabarsingh Thapa and was sixteen years old on April 1835.

Ganesh Kumari is mother of Jung Bahadur Rana, founder of Rana dynasty.

He was the owner of Thapathali Durbar.

References

Sources

1777 births
1806 deaths
Bagale Thapa
Nepalese generals
Nepalese military personnel killed in action
Nepalese military personnel
People from Gorkha District
People of the Nepalese unification
Nepalese Hindus